Mallard and Claret is a popular fishing fly in the United Kingdom.  Also known as the 'M and C' it is a good general pattern that imitates a wide range of trout food items.  The Mallard and Claret fly was created in the 1850s by Aberdeen fly tyer William Murdock.

Materials
As its name suggests, this fly is constructed from the feathers of a mallard duck together with a claret coloured body.

References

Artificial flies